Matthew Maguire may refer to:

 Matt Maguire (born 1984), Australian rules footballer
 Matthew Maguire (labor activist), American labor activist